Daniel Flores may refer to:
 Daniel Flores (sailor) (born 1981), Olympic sailor
 Daniel Flores (soccer) (born 2003), American soccer player
 Daniel E. Flores (born 1961), Roman Catholic bishop
 Dan Flores (born 1948), historian of the American West and professor at the University of Montana
 Dan Flores (American football) (born 1977), American football player
 Danny Flores (1929–2006), singer and writer of the song "Tequila"